JL Studios Recording is a professional multitrack recording studio located in Toronto, Ontario, Canada.

History
The studio was originally set up in 1989 by Jeffrey Leclair,  but forced to move in 1992 when the building was sold. The studio relocated to its current location in a former fur and diamond factory in 1994. The Purman building is listed on The City of Toronto's Inventory of Heritage Properties.

Recording artists
Artists who have recorded at JL Studios Recording include Robert Pattinson, Victor Garber, Richard Thomas (actor), Bobby Curtola, Billy Newton-Davis, No U-Turn Recordings, Universal Music Group, R. Jay Soward, Dinah Christie, Dean McDermott, Jackie Burroughs, Jennifer Dale, Tom Kneebone

External links
The Official Website of JL Studios Recording

Recording studios in Canada
Music of Toronto
Mass media companies established in 1989